A View from the Terrace is a Scottish football magazine and factual television television series. It is broadcast on BBC Scotland and repeated on BBC One in Scotland.

The show is produced by creative agency Studio Something and is adapted from the long-running podcast The Terrace.

History
The show was launched in the opening week of the new BBC Scotland channel. It is hosted by Craig G. Telfer and features the recurring cast of Craig Fowler, Joel Sked, Shaughan McGuigan and Robert Borthwick. The panel take a loving and scathing look at Scottish football from the top of the leagues to the bottom as well as exploring the culture that surrounds the game in Scotland. Each show is built around studio debate as well as number of outside VTs that explore the further culture of the game. These have to date taken the form of observational documentaries, light-entertainment pastiches, short films, spoken word, animation and scripted drama. The most common features used in the show are "The Boyata Index", "On The Fence", "Time Capsule" and "See Ya Later Debater".

Each episode of the first series closed with a popular Scottish musician or band playing a version of one of their team's most famous songs; some of the artists to perform have been Admiral Fallow, Fatherson, HYYTS, STPHNX and We Were Promised Jetpacks. This feature was used intermittently in following series. Along with continuing to shine a light on up-and-coming musical talent from Scotland and beyond, the show began to curate archive-based love letters to some of Scottish football's most iconic moments, using fan voices to tell those stories with features including St. Johnstone's famous Scottish Cup win and the Scottish Women National Team's send off at Hampden ahead of the 2019 Women's World Cup.

The original 10-part series was extended to 13 episodes to take the show up to the eve of the 2019 Scottish Cup Final. The show was recommissioned by BBC for a second season of 20 episodes and returned on 27 September 2019. Following the abrupt end to the 2019–20 season due to the COVID-19 pandemic, a compilation show entitled The Best of A View from the Terrace was screened. Additionally, the show's team continued to create similar output via their long-running podcast, including a series of shows entitled A View from the Lockdown, where the presenters took popular elements from the television show to discuss non-football-related topics.

The third run of the show launched in October 2020, navigating a UK-wide lockdown to produce 20 episodes of fan-focussed studio and short feature content. The fourth in began October 2021; it included more guest panellists than previous seasons, including podcast regular Graeme Thewliss and comedian Ray Bradshaw.

Following Scotland Men's National Team qualification for the delayed Euro 2020 Championships in 2021, a 3-part spin off titled A View from the Euros was aired to accompany the tournament. Applying the show's trademark humour and style with a continental twist, it celebrated what it meant to be Scottish as the national side returned to major tournament football. During A View from the Euros, famous Scottish football songs were covered in different genres from countries partaking in the Euros competition. For example The Proclaimers' "I'm Gonna Be (500 Miles)" was played by a Spanish flamenco band.

Throughout the program's run they have conducted interviews with some of the most well known faces in Scottish football like Kenny Miller, Rory Loy, David Martindale, Gemma Fay and Jack Ross and some that are less so such as Rose Reilly and Fiona McIntyre of the SFA.

After the end of Series 4, it was announced that A View From The Terrace would be performing a live end-of-season review show at St. Luke's in Glasgow. The show saw many of the regular features (See Ya Later, Debater and Future Headlines featured) as well as a special edition of the Club Shop where audience members had the chance to win a Peterhead branded bottle of hand sanitiser, a diamanté Raith Rovers shirt claimed by Shaughan, and a Buckie Thistle torch keyring to name but a few of the fantastic prizes on offer. The show saw all the regular contributors to the show bar Bradshaw and Hamilton, as well as two special guests in the form of Marvin Bartley and Dylan Easton.

A sixth series was announced on the show's Twitter account, starting on February 3, 2023.

Regular Features
Throughout the run of programme there have been many sections that have appeared throughout every series and often several episodes in the same series. These include:

 Social Media Section: For the first three series of the programme the four hosts were joined by Robert Borthwick who guided the boys through a whistle-stop tour of the best parts of Scottish football social media from the past week. After the decision to rotate the cast on an episode to episode basis, Telfer and the co-hosts would go through the social media section together as a group. During the festive period, this section often included a look into what a selection of Scottish clubs were selling as Christmas gifts such as a St Mirren F.C. lip balm, an Aberdeen F.C. cat flap or the notorious Raith Rovers F.C. ''Roaring Back'' mugs from their doomed attempt to escape from League 1.
 Put A Shift In: Documentary filmmaker Duncan Cowles is not a fan of football. But Duncan McKay is and wants to try out as many different roles related to football as possible. Throughout the run of the programme, Duncan and Duncan travel the length and breadth of the country trying out lots of different jobs at all levels of football. Some of the highlights include dressing up as Roary the Lion at Stark's Park, being a ballboy at Hampden Park, co-commentator and lead commentator for an Airdrieonians F.C. game and taking up the mantle of being assistant manager at Caledonian Braves F.C. for one game only.
 The Boyata Index: A section where the boys would, based upon the hypothetical valuation set on at the time Celtic defender Dedryck Boyata by pundit John Hartson of £50million, speculate as to how much players throughout the SPFL would cost using the same barometer. These included that Stephen Dobbie was worth £150million and that Oliver Burke was worth a bag of balls.
 The Gaffer: Shining the spotlight on the lesser-known managers throughout Scotland who have fascinating stories to tell, like Shadab Iftikhar who is the first South-Asian to manage any Scottish football club, former Albion Rovers F.C. manager Kevin Harper, University of Stirling head coach Chris Geddes, or Bailey Hanlon, manager of Kilsyth Athletic and youngest manager of a football club in Scotland at 22 years old.
 Scottish Passport: Interviews with Scottish players who are currently playing in leagues outside of Britain such as Lana Clelland and Steven Lennon.
 Home: Taking a closer look at some of the smaller football clubs in Scotland that have interesting stories to share like Eriskay F.C., Orkney Women's F.C. and Campbeltown A.F.C.
 Player Spotlights (goes by different names): as well as speaking to managers about their careers, there are often interviews with current and former players about all sorts of things. These include an interview with Rachael Boyle after she took time out of the game after giving birth, Chris Cadden being very open about his mental health, Ryan Stevenson talking about his tattoos and why they mean so much to him,  Christian Nadé talking about what it is like to have played for so many different teams in different countries throughout his career and an interview with Zander Murray, Scotland and one of the world's first current footballers to come out as gay.
 The Banker (originally Bank or Bust): The panellists choose two games from the upcoming weekends fixtures that they are absolutely sure of what the outcome will be and another where it is just too tight to call. This section was a competition format, the panellist gaining points if their ''banker'' came out correctly with the player with the most points at the end of the series taking home the Eamonn Brophy Lone Wolf Trophy. Series 4 took the format of Telfer vs all other panellists. Additional rules are occasionally thrown in to gain bonus points or make the game a little more challenging, for example ''You must predict a team that lost last weekend will win this weekend'' or ''Bonus points if you predict an away win''. Joel Sked is notoriously bad at the game, picking a draw almost every week, while Telfer is known to go for the safe bet of whoever is top of the league playing someone lower down such as Celtic F.C., Rangers F.C., Cove Rangers F.C., Kelty Hearts F.C. or Queen's Park F.C. playing the likes of anyone else in the Premiership or anybody particularly struggling or languishing at the bottom of the Championship and Leagues One and Two.
 Last Minute Winner: For the opening few series this began as songs associated with specific football teams being played by fans of those clubs, such as Hibs fan Louis Abbott of Admiral Fallow performing Sunshine on Leith or Dunfermline-based band The Skids performing Into the Valley. Later on, this feature began to include fan stories from memorable moments in Scottish football history such as St Johnstone F.C. winning their first ever piece of silverware in 2014 or Queen of the South F.C. reaching the Scottish Cup semi-final in 2008, and also short interviews with club legends about past glories such as Colin Hendry on what it was like to captain his country or Jim Leishman talking about his playing career and then his managerial career with Dunfermline.

Appearances
After the successful appearance of Graeme Thewliss during A View From The Euros, more regular contributors and friends of the show were invited to contribute. To date, host Craig G Telfer has appeared in all but one of the studio shows (A View From The Euros, Episode 3) due to a positive COVID-19 test. However he did appear briefly via video call. In Series 2 and 3, there were a total of 3 Best Of episodes, as Telfer introduced the best clips from the previous series alone in the studio. As of Series 5, Episode 7:

 Robert Borthwick only appeared in the regular ″Social Media Review″ section for the first three series, until he became a more regular panellist from Episode 3 of A View From The Euros onwards.

 Before becoming a more regular contributor, Graeme Thewliss made two appearances in the earlier series of the show, in a section called ″Come Consi-Dine With Me″ where a famous footballer taught him to cook their speciality. These were making sushi with former Heart of Midlothian F.C. and Dundee United F.C. player Ryan McGowan and baking empire biscuits with Motherwell F.C. player Stephen O'Donnell.

 Podcast contributor Gary Cocker has made two appearances in the early series interviewing two players in informal setting, called ″First Mates″. These were former Hamilton Academical F.C. and Partick Thistle F.C. player Ziggy Gordon, a former child chess champion, over a chess board and former Hamilton Academical F.C. player Steve Davies in an escape room.

Throughout the program's run there have been many guest appearances from various people involved in Scottish football, including but not limited to:

Reception
The show has been described as "quietly but bravely pushing boundaries" and "injecting the fun back into the football on TV for the first time since Baddiel and Skinner's Fantasy Football League" by The Scotsman; Kevin McKenna in The Observer described it as "the best football show on UK television by far". Football periodical Mundial described it as "the reason why you should give a shit about Scottish football" and BBC Scotland credited it as being a part of the "new wave of fan led football content".

The show was nominated for a Broadcast 2020 Award for Best Sports Programme.

References

External links

BBC Scotland television shows
2019 Scottish television series debuts
Football mass media in Scotland